Amla tehsil is a fourth-order administrative and revenue division, a subdivision of third-order administrative and revenue division of Betul district of Madhya Pradesh.

Geography
Amla tehsil has an area of 682.40 sq kilometers. It is bounded by Ghodadongari tehsil in the northwest, Chhindwara district in the north, northeast and east, Multai tehsil in the southeast and south and Betul tehsil in the southwest and west.

See also 
Betul district

Citations

External links

Tehsils of Madhya Pradesh
Betul district